The Secret Life of Walter Mitty is a 1947 Technicolor comedy film, loosely based on the 1939 short story of the same name by James Thurber. The film stars Danny Kaye as a young daydreaming proofreader (later associate editor) for a magazine publishing firm and Virginia Mayo as the girl of his dreams. The film was adapted for the screen by Ken Englund, Everett Freeman, and Philip Rapp (uncredited), and directed by Norman Z. McLeod.

Plot
Walter Mitty (Kaye) is an "inconsequential guy from Perth Amboy, New Jersey". He is henpecked and harassed by everyone in his life including his bossy mother, his overbearing, idea-stealing boss Bruce Pierce, his dimwitted fiancée Gertrude Griswold, Gertrude's obnoxious would-be suitor Tubby Wadsworth, Gertrude's poodle Queenie and her loud-mouthed mother, Mrs. Griswold.

Walter's escape from their incessant needling is to imagine all sorts of exciting and impossible lives for himself, fueled by the pulp magazines he reads every day as an editor at the Pierce Publishing Company. But his dreams only seem to land him in more trouble. In one scene, while stoking the heating boiler, he dreams what it would be like to be an RAF fighter pilot. He is awakened from this daydream by his mother, who orders him to come to dinner. Believing he is still a British fighter pilot, he salutes, and places a red-hot poker under his arm—only to burn a hole in his suit jacket.

Things become much more complicated when he runs into a mysterious woman, Rosalind van Hoorn (Mayo), who just happens to perfectly resemble the girl of his dreams. Rosalind is working with her uncle, Peter van Hoorn, to help secure some Dutch crown jewels hidden from the Nazis during World War II. Caught up in a real-life adventure that seems unbelievable even to him, Walter attempts to hide his double life from his mundane family and friends. Eventually, he acquires the courage to stand up to those who kick him around.

Cast
 Danny Kaye as Walter Mitty
 Virginia Mayo as Rosalind van Hoorn
 Boris Karloff as Dr. Hollingshead
 Fay Bainter as Mrs. Eunice Mitty
 Thurston Hall as Bruce Pierce
 Ann Rutherford as Gertrude Griswald
 Gordon Jones as Tubby Wadsworth
 Florence Bates as Mrs. Griswald  
 Konstantin Shayne as Peter van Hoorn  
 Reginald Denny as Colonel  
 Henry Corden as Hendrick  
 Doris Lloyd as Mrs. Leticia Follinsbee 
 Fritz Feld as Anatole  
 Frank Reicher as Maasdam  
 Milton Parsons as The Butler
 Ethan Laidlaw as Helmsman (uncredited)
 Sam McDaniel as Doorman (uncredited)
 Charles Trowbridge as Dr. Renshaw (uncredited)
 The Goldwyn Girls

Production
Ken Englund and Everett Freeman reportedly began work adapting James Thurber's story in January 1945. According to Thurber, producer Samuel Goldwyn rejected the Englund and Freeman script in December 1945, and sent Englund to consult with Thurber, who worked with him for ten days. Thurber later complained that at one time the psychiatrist scene contained "a bathing girl incident which will haunt me all the days of my life." He was repeatedly consulted by Goldwyn, but his suggestions were largely ignored. In a letter to Life magazine, Thurber expressed his considerable dissatisfaction with the script, even as Goldwyn insisted in another letter that Thurber approved of it. Thurber also mentioned that Goldwyn asked him not to read part of the script, because it was "too blood and thirsty." Thurber said that he read the entire script anyway, and was "horror and struck".

In moving away from Thurber's material, Goldwyn instead had the writers customize the film to showcase Kaye's talents, altering the original story so much that Thurber called the film "The Public Life of Danny Kaye".

Goldwyn also briefly changed the film's title to I Wake Up Dreaming in response to a Gallup poll he had commissioned, a title that was actually a word play on the 1941 Steve Fisher novel I Wake  Up Screaming (and the 1941 film of the same name). However, Goldwyn soon changed it back to Thurber's title in response to the angry protests of Thurber fans, as reported in a May 1947 article in Collier's Weekly.

The film includes many of Kaye's trademark patter-songs and one of his best-remembered dream characters, "Anatole of Paris," a fey women's milliner whose inspiration for the ridiculous chapeaux he creates is in actuality his loathing of women. The Anatole character is based on "Antoine de Paris," a women's hair-salon professional of the era, known for creating preposterous hairstyles. The lyrics to the song Anatole of Paris were written by Kaye's wife, Sylvia Fine.

Reception
The Secret Life of Walter Mitty ranks 479th on Empire magazine's 2008 list of the 500 greatest movies of all time.

Adaptations to other media
The Secret Life of Walter Mitty was dramatized as a half-hour radio play on the November 3, 1947 broadcast of The Screen Guild Theater with Kaye and Mayo in their original film roles.

Remake

Plans to remake The Secret Life of Walter Mitty arose in the early 1990s, with producer Samuel Goldwyn Jr. considering actor Jim Carrey for the starring role. After development that spanned over two decades, the film finally came to fruition with Ben Stiller as the lead actor and the director. The film was released in the US on December 25, 2013.

See also
 List of American films of 1947
 Boris Karloff filmography

References

External links
 
 
 

1947 films
1940s musical comedy-drama films
1940s romantic comedy-drama films
1940s fantasy comedy-drama films
American fantasy comedy-drama films
American musical comedy-drama films
American musical fantasy films
American romantic comedy-drama films
American romantic fantasy films
American romantic musical films
Films based on short fiction
Films based on works by James Thurber
Films directed by Norman Z. McLeod
Films scored by David Raksin
Films set in Connecticut
Films set in New Jersey
Samuel Goldwyn Productions films
Works about photojournalism
1940s romantic fantasy films
1947 comedy films
1940s American films